Nobel Zogli professionally known as Nektunez is  US-based Ghanaian music producer and a sound engineer. He came into the limelight after his Ameno Amapiano remix of a French song became a global hit in the last quarter of 2021. In December 2021, the remixed song debuted at number 10 on Billboard World Digital sales. By February 2022, TikTok videos created with the song had almost 10 billion views. In December 2021, the remixed song debuted at number 10 on Billboard World Digital sales.

Early Life & Career Beginning 
Nektunez was born in Volta region, Ho Ghana, where he grew up as a Catholic.

He started his music journey by playing traditional and percussion instruments in high school after which he settled on music as a career.

Education 
He holds a bachelor's degree in political science from the University of Ghana.

References

Living people
Ghanaian record producers
People from Kumasi
Year of birth missing (living people)